Koenigsmark is a 1918 adventure novel by the French writer Pierre Benoît. It has been published in English as The Secret Spring.

Story
The story is about the love of a young French tutor, Raoul Vignerte, for Aurora, the grand duchess of Lautenbourg-Detmold.
In 1912, Aurora, who came from the steppes of Russia, marries Grand Duke Rudolph of Lautenbourg, heir to the throne of a small German principality. But he dies mysteriously while on a mission to Africa. In 1913, Raoul Vignerte arrives at the palace as tutor. Meanwhile, Aurora has married Rudolph's brother Frederic de Lautenbourg. Vignerte falls in love with the fascinating Aurora, who enjoys his company. In addition to this romantic intrigue, is a mixture of political and police intrigue regarding Grand Duke Rudolph's mysterious death in Africa.

Adaptations
The story has been adapted several times for the screen
 Koenigsmark (1923 film)
 Koenigsmark (1935 film)
 Koenigsmark (1953 film) 
 Koenigsmark (1968 film)

References

External link
 

1918 French novels
French adventure novels
French novels adapted into films
Novels by Pierre Benoit
1918 debut novels